Moiano is a comune (municipality) in the Province of Benevento in the Italian region Campania, located about  northeast of Naples and about  southwest of Benevento on the western slope of the Monte Taburno, on the river Isclero.

The economy is mostly agricultural (cereals, fruit, vine). The main attraction is the church of St. Sebastian, with a fresco cycle by Tommaso Giaquinto.

References

External links
Official website

Cities and towns in Campania